Irbe (also  Dižirbe, Dižirve, Irbes upe, Irve, Livonian:  Īra) is a coastal river on the northern Courland Peninsula, Latvia. Of length 32 km, it starts as the confluence of Stende and  rivers  and it follows the coastline of the Irbe Strait, reaching the Baltic Sea in the Irbe Strait about halfway between the promontories of the Oviši Lighthouse and cape Kolka. It runs within the Tārgale parish, Ventspils district.

The brown moor water of the river constantly moves  large sandbanks in its estuary. The river is used as spawning ground by brown trouts.

References

Further reading
Irba, an entry in Geographical Dictionary of the Kingdom of Poland, vol III, p. 299

Rivers of Latvia
Baltic Sea
Courland